The women's 3000 metres relay competition of the Short track speed skating at the 2015 Winter Universiade was held at the Universiade Igloo, Granada the semifinal was held on February 12, and final was held on February 13.

Results

Semifinals
 QA — qualified for Final A
 QB - qualified for Final B
 ADV — advanced
 PEN — penalty

Final B (classification round)

Final A (medal round)

Women's relay
Univ